Parliamentary elections were held in Gazankulu on 13 September 1978.

References

Gazankulu
Elections in South African bantustans
Gazankulu
Gazankulu legislative election